Leptocroca scholaea is a moth of the family Oecophoridae. It was described by Edward Meyrick in 1884. It is found in New Zealand.

References

 Leptocroca scholaea in insectin

Moths described in 1884
Oecophoridae
Taxa named by Edward Meyrick
Moths of New Zealand
Endemic fauna of New Zealand
Endemic moths of New Zealand